Alsophila glaziovii is an obsolete synonym of two species of tree ferns:

 Alsophila glaziovii Fée, 1869, syn. of Cyathea glaziovii
 Alsophila glaziovii Baker, syn. of Cyathea corcovadensis